Popular News Journal is a Burmese weekly newspaper,  publication of Asian Fame Media Group, based in Yangon, Myanmar. The journal published in Myanmar since 29 January 2009.

See also
List of newspapers in Burma
Media of Burma

External links
 Popular News Journal
 

Weekly newspapers published in Myanmar